Balaustium medicagoense is a species of mite belonging to the family Erythraeidae. This large, densely hairy mite is up to 1.6 mm in length with one pair of eyes set well back on the body. The first pair of legs is just longer than the body.

This mite is associated with Medicago sativa and various other plants and has been recorded in the vicinity of Caledon and Grabouw, South Africa.

References
Nine new species of the superfamily Erythraeoidea (Acarina: Trombidiformes) associated with plants in South Africa, Magdalena K.P. Meyer & P.A.J. Ryke, Acarologia I

Trombidiformes
Animals described in 1959
Endemic fauna of South Africa